Desonta Bradford (born April 12, 1996) is an American basketball player for Telenet Giants Antwerp of the Belgian BNXT League. He played college basketball for East Tennessee State. He was named the 2017–18 Southern Conference Player of the Year by the league's coaches.

Early career
Bradford was a key piece of the Humboldt High School team that won a 2013 Class A state championship. As a freshman at East Tennessee State, he averaged 4.1 points per game. He improved to 6.8 points per game as a sophomore.

As a senior, Bradford averaged 15.5 points, 5.8 rebounds, and 3.5 assists per game, and led the league in steals. At the close of the season, he was awarded the Malcolm U. Pitt SoCon Player of the Year by the league's coaches while Wofford's Fletcher Magee got the nod from the media.

Professional career
On July 20, 2018, Bradford signed with Hungarian team Egis Körmend.

On July 4, 2019, Bradford signed with Phoenix Brussels of the Belgian Pro Basketball League (PBL). He averaged 10.2 points, 3.9 rebounds, 2.8 assists, and 1.9 steals per game. On July 28, 2021, Bradford signed with Dolomiti Energia Trento of the Lega Basket Serie A.

On August 17, 2022, he has signed with Hapoel Be'er Sheva of the Israeli Basketball Premier League. On September 2, 2022, he left the team without playing a single game related to personal problems.

On November 12, 2022, he signed with Telenet Giants Antwerp of the Belgian BNXT League. On 12 March 2023, Bradford and the Giants won the Belgian Cup after beating BC Oostende in the final. He scored a shared team-high 18 points in the final.

References

External links
ETSU Buccaneers bio
NBADraft.net profile

1996 births
Living people
American expatriate basketball people in Belgium
American expatriate basketball people in Hungary
American men's basketball players
Antwerp Giants players
Aquila Basket Trento players
Basketball players from Tennessee
BC Körmend players
Brussels Basketball players
East Tennessee State Buccaneers men's basketball players
People from Humboldt, Tennessee
Shooting guards